Emilio Dierna (born 12 February 1987) is an Italian football player. He plays for Follonica Gavorrano.

Club career
He made his Serie B debut for Grosseto on 1 June 2008 in a game against Spezia.

On 7 July 2020 he signed with Follonica Gavorrano.

References

External links
 
 

1987 births
People from Gela
Footballers from Sicily
Living people
Italian footballers
Association football defenders
A.S. Cosenza Calcio players
Montevarchi Calcio Aquila 1902 players
F.C. Grosseto S.S.D. players
A.S.D. Sangiovannese 1927 players
U.S. Poggibonsi players
S.S. Arezzo players
A.C. Ancona players
U.S. Viterbese 1908 players
A.S. Gubbio 1910 players
Modena F.C. players
U.S. Gavorrano players
Serie B players
Serie C players
Serie D players
Sportspeople from the Province of Caltanissetta